1107 Lictoria is a large Hygiea asteroid, approximately  in diameter, from the outer regions of the asteroid belt. It was discovered by Luigi Volta at the Pino Torinese Observatory in 1929, and named after the Fasces Lictores, Latin for "Fasci Littori", the symbol of the Italian fascist party.

Discovery 

It was officially discovered on 30 March 1929, by Italian astronomer Luigi Volta at the Observatory of Turin near Pino Torinese, Italy. Three weeks later, on 17 March 1929, it was independently discovered by astronomer Karl Reinmuth at Heidelberg, Germany. The Minor Planet Center only acknowledges the first discoverer.

Orbit and classification 

This asteroid is a member of the Hygiea family, a very large family of carbonaceous outer-belt asteroids, named after the fourth-largest asteroid, 10 Hygiea. It orbits the Sun in the outer asteroid belt at a distance of 2.8–3.6 AU once every 5 years and 8 months (2,076 days; semi-major axis of 3.18 AU). Its orbit has an eccentricity of 0.12 and an inclination of 7° with respect to the ecliptic.

Naming 

This minor planet was named after the symbol of fascism used by the Italian Fascist Party. The symbol was called "Fasci Littori", or "Fasces Lictores" in Latin (derived from fasces and lictor). Several other things such as festivals (littoriali) and fast trains (littorine) were given related names during the fascist period. In particular, the Italian city of Latina was founded under the name "Littoria" in 1932. The author of the Dictionary of Minor Planet Names, Lutz Schmadel, corresponded with Italian-born astronomer Paul Comba to confirm the meaning for this asteroid.

Physical characteristics 

In the Bus–Binzel SMASS classification, Lictoria is a Xc-subtype that transitions from the X-type to the carbonaceous C-type asteroids. It has also been characterized as a primitive P-type asteroid by the Wide-field Infrared Survey Explorer (WISE). The Hygiea family's overall spectral type is a mixture of C-type and somewhat brighter B-type asteroids.

Rotation period 

Several rotational lightcurve of Lictoria have been obtained from photometric observations by astronomers William Koff, Eric Barbotin, Stefano Sposetti and Matthieu Conjat, as well as Hiromi and Hiroko Hamanowa. Analysis f the best-rated lightcurve from February 2008 gave a rotation period of 8.5616 hours with a consolidated brightness variation between 0.16 and 0.30 magnitude.

Diameter and albedo 

According to the surveys carried out by the Infrared Astronomical Satellite IRAS, the Japanese Akari satellite and the NEOWISE mission of NASA's WISE telescope, Lictoria measures between 69.93 and 86.724 kilometers in diameter and its surface has a low albedo between 0.05 and 0.066.

The Collaborative Asteroid Lightcurve Link derives an albedo of 0.045 and a diameter of 78.86 kilometers based on an absolute magnitude of 9.5.

Notes

References

External links 
 Asteroid Lightcurve Database (LCDB), query form (info )
 Dictionary of Minor Planet Names, Google books
 Asteroids and comets rotation curves, CdR – Geneva Observatory, Raoul Behrend
 Discovery Circumstances: Numbered Minor Planets (1)-(5000) – Minor Planet Center
 
 

001107
Discoveries by Luigi Volta
Named minor planets
001107
19290330